Triệu Việt Hưng (born 19 January 1997) is a Vietnamese footballer who plays as a central midfielder for V.League 1 club Hải Phòng, on loan from Hoàng Anh Gia Lai.

International career

International goals

Vietnam U-16

Vietnam U-23

Honours
Vietnam U21
International U-21 Thanh Niên Newspaper Cup: Runner-up 2017

References 

1997 births
Living people
Vietnamese footballers
Association football midfielders
V.League 1 players
Hoang Anh Gia Lai FC players
People from Hải Dương province
Competitors at the 2019 Southeast Asian Games
Southeast Asian Games medalists in football
Southeast Asian Games gold medalists for Vietnam